NGC 5566 is a barred spiral galaxy in the constellation Virgo, which is approximately 65 million light years away from Earth. The galaxy is the biggest in the constellation Virgo, stretching nearly 150,000 light years in diameter. The galaxy NGC 5566 was discovered on 30 April 1786 by the German-British astronomer William Herschel. It is included in Halton Arp's Atlas of Peculiar Galaxies. It is a member of the NGC 5566 Group of galaxies, itself one of the Virgo III Groups strung out to the east of the Virgo Supercluster of galaxies.

Gallery

References

External links
 
 GALEX
 NOAO 
 Atlas of the Universe, The Virgo III Group
 Spiral Galaxies in Virgo
 Jeff Burons's Astronomie Blog, NGC 5566
 NGC 5566 and company 
 SEDS

Virgo (constellation)
5566
09175
30083
286
Barred spiral galaxies